B. J. Medical College (BJMC) is a medical college located in  Pune, Maharashtra, India. The college, administered by the Government of Maharashtra, comprises clinical and para/pre-clinical departments working alongside the Sassoon General Hospital. Founded by Byramjee Jeejeebhoy in 1878.

History
The B.J. Medical School was started in 1878 and was converted to full-fledged B.J. Medical College in 1946.

In 1924, Mahatma Gandhi was operated for acute appendicitis in this college.

Location

B.J. Medical College and the allied Sassoon General Hospitals are near Pune Railway Station, in a busy area of the city. B.J. Medical College is a Two-minute walk from Pune central railway station.

Hospital facilities
The hospital serves the needs of patients from urban and rural Pune. It is also a major referral centre for many of the surrounding districts. The hospital has facilities in medical specialities including a cardiac catheterization laboratory, CT imaging, upper gastrointestinal tract endoscopy, etc. Weekly clinics are run for medical and surgical superspecialties.

Courses and admissions

Undergraduate

Every year, the college admits 250 students to the undergraduate (MBBS) course via NEET.15% AIQ quota is there for All India students and 85% is the state quota. Earlier the method of selection was a combination of entrance examinations held at the state and national levels. The duration of training is four and a half years years followed by compulsory internship for 1 year in urban and rural settings.

Post graduate

B.J. Medical College, Pune offers training in pre-clinical, para-clinical, and clinical disciplines. Previously granting degrees under the University of Pune, the institute is now affiliated to the Maharashtra University of Health Sciences (MUHS), Nasik. The duration of training is three years for degree (MD or MS) courses and two years for diploma courses. For undergraduate courses, the method of selection is by competitive entrance examinations held at the state and national levels. In addition, some seats are reserved for medical officers who have completed a pre-specified number of years of service in the rural areas of the state of Maharashtra.

Superspeciality
The superspeciality training course offered is MCh in Cardiovascular and Thoracic Surgery (CVTS), plastic surgery, neurosurgery.

Certificate Course in Modern Pharmacology (CCMP)

It is a one-year course conducted at the college for practising Homoeopathic General Practitioners(GP's) who wish to practice Allopathy and tide over the shortage of doctors in the State of Maharashtra.

Certificate Course in “Modern Pharmacology” For Registered Homoeopathic Practitioners in The State of Maharashtra, Sanctioned by Academic Council of Maharashtra University of Health Science,(MUHS), Nasik.

Notable alumni

Notable alumni include:
 Shreeram Lagoo
 Mohan Agashe
 Shrikar Pardeshi
 Jabbar Patel
 Shirish Hiremath
 Sharad Moreshwar Hardikar
Himmatrao Bawaskar
Chirag Shah
YS Chandrashekhar
KB Grant
Shashank Shah

References

External links
 

Medical colleges in Maharashtra
Universities and colleges in Pune
Educational institutions established in 1878
1878 establishments in India
Affiliates of Maharashtra University of Health Sciences